Sebastian Kobiernicki of Dołęga coat of arms (died 1596) was a 16th century clerk and politician in the Crown of the Kingdom of Poland and the Polish–Lithuanian Commonwealth. He was a member of parliament representing the Płock Voivodeship in the Sejm of the Polish–Lithuanian Commonwealth in 1576, 1582, and 1587. In 1585, he was a representative in the Crown Tribunal, and in 1587, he was a land writer (notary) of the Płock Land.

He was member of the knight class nobility of the Polish–Lithuanian Commonwealth, as the member of the heraldic clan of Dołęga coat of arms.

References 

Polish government officials
Government officials of the Polish–Lithuanian Commonwealth
Polish civil servants
People from Płock
Politicians from Płock
16th-century Polish nobility
Members of the Sejm of the Polish–Lithuanian Commonwealth
Year of birth unknown
1596 deaths